Abuyog (IPA: [ʔɐ'bujog]), officially the Municipality of Abuyog, is a 1st class municipality in the province of Leyte, Philippines. According to the 2020 census, it has a population of 61,216 people.

Facing Leyte Gulf out into the Philippine Sea, it is the largest town of the island of Leyte in terms of land area. It is bordered to the north by Javier, to the west by Mahaplag and Baybay and to the south by Silago in Southern Leyte.

Abuyog got its name when Spanish bread sailors came ashore in an early settlement at the mouth of the Abuyog River to replenish their supplies. Swarms of bees were all over the shore. The Spaniards asked the natives "¿Cómo se llama el pueblo?", not knowing that the Spaniards asked for the town's name, the natives answered "Buyog". Repeating after the natives, the sailors muttered, "Ah! Buyog". Eventually the town came to be known as "Abuyog" to which some Spanish chroniclers often used in reference to the whole island of Leyte. But Abuyog in the early annals, though grown prosperous, remained obscure because of the absence of a powerful chieftain. It was Datu Bangcao, who had his seat of government in Carigara, who ruled Abuyog.

People mostly from Samar migrated to Abuyog because of the many opportunities the immigrants got from its rich soil. The language of this town which acquired the name "melting pot" became Waray-Waray language from the Samar immigrants.

Geography

Barangays 
Abuyog is politically subdivided into 63 barangays.

 Alangilan
 Anibongon
 Buaya
 Bagacay
 Bahay
 Balinsasayao
 Balocawe
 Balocawehay
 Barayong
 Bayabas
 Bito (Poblacion)
 Buenavista
 Bulak
 Buntay (Poblacion)
 Bunga
 Burubud-an
 Cagbolo
 Can-aporong
 Canmarating
 Can-uguib (Poblacion)
 Capilian
 Cadac-an
 Combis
 Dingle
 Guintagbucan (Poblacion)
 Hampipila
 Katipunan
 Kikilo
 Laray
 Lawa-an
 Libertad
 Loyonsawang (Poblacion)
 Mahagna (New Cagbolo)
 Mag-atubang
 Mahayahay
 Maitum
 Malaguicay
 Matagnao
 Nalibunan (Poblacion)
 Nibga
 Odiongan
 Pagsang-an
 Paguite
 Parasanon
 Picas Sur
 Pilar
 Pinamanagan
 Salvasion
 San Francisco
 San Isidro
 San Roque
 Santa Fe (Poblacion)
 Santa Lucia
 Santo Niño (Poblacion)
 Tabigue
 Tadoc
 New Taligue
 Old Taligue
 Tib-o
 Tinalian
 Tinocolan
 Tuy-a
 Victory (Poblacion)

Climate

Demographics

Economy

History
In 1588, presumably on account of mal-administration of the incumbent encomendero, the inhabitants revolted. Capitan Juan Esguerra had to send a punitive force to chastise the assassins of the encomendero. In 1613, Sanguiles and Caragas plundered and marauded the town.

In 1655 the Jesuits made Abuyog their second post, with Dagami as the center. The year 1716 saw the founding of the town and parish under the patronage of St. Francis Xavier, the apostle of the Indies. The Augustinians took over in 1768 and continued the work of Frs. Jose Herrera and Cipriano Barbasan. The people of this era, according to Fr. Augustin Maria de Castro, were very rich though extremely belligerent; the continually defied the Moros. In 1843 the town was given to the Franciscan Order with Fr. Santiago Malonda as the first Franciscan parish priest. A horse path was opened between Abuyog and Dulag in 1851.

The early captains were Galza, Foran, Nicolas Mandia, Faustino Remanes, Prudencio Remanes, Felipe Costin, Ciriaco Costin, Eulalio Brillo, and Vicente Tiaoson. Eulalio Brillo became president in 1896-1899 while Nazario Tupa took office in 1900. Eugenio Villote finished Tupa's term.

The period 1901 to 1906 was notable for the notorious pulahanes or bolero attacks, the most infamous leader of which was Faustino Ablen. The municipal building was razed. Ex-Capitan Eugenio Villote, Pedro Gonazaga, and two other policemen were killed in the encounter.

In the electoral division made by the Philippine Assembly, Abuyog was placed in the third district of Leyte. During the Commonwealth regime, Abuyog was transferred to the fourth district. During these periods, the town prospered under the administration of Arturo Brillo, Vicente Brillante, Basilio Adolfo (two terms), Antero Brillo and Ricardo Collantes (three terms). In 1940, Pedro Gallego was elected mayor and served until July 3, 1946, Mayor Pedro Remanes Gallego was the only mayor of Leyte province who did not surrender to the Japanese forces. On July 4, 1946, Catalino Landia was appointed mayor. He was re-elected for three terms.

Abuyog's progress took greater strides with the inauguration of the first passenger bus service in 1925. In 1936, the vice-president Sergio Osmeña inaugurated the Baybay-Abuyog road, thus linking for the first time, by good road, the eastern and western coasts of Leyte.

At the outbreak of World War II, Abuyog became a Japanese occupied area.  Pedro Gallego retreated to the mountains to administratively led the guerrilla resistance while encouraging his people to continue working on agricultural lands.  His wife, Ignacia Regis Gallego, organised the non-combatant Auxiliary Forces to fed guerrillas fighting the Japanese

On October 13, 1942, the Japanese abandoned the town due to guerrilla pressure. They came back on November 26, 1943, much stronger this time, yet they suffered heavy losses in the hands of the guerrillas.

On July 14, 1944, when the submarine "Nautilus" landed in Barangay San Roque, Mayor Gallego provided the logistics (manpower, bamboo rafts, transport, lookouts) to Colonel Ruperto Kangleon (the head of Leyte Resistance Movement) to unload 72 tons of automatic weapons (Thompson submachine guns and other rapid fires like carbine and M1 Garand guns), ammunition, food and propaganda materials for Leyte and Samar guerrillas.

Kangleon tipped the naval officers of Nautilus on the locations of Japanese fortifications in Leyte province, which MacArthur bombed during the Battle of Leyte Gulf on October 23–26 that year, the last but largest naval battle of WWII.

The local guerrillas of Abuyog, with headquarters in Barangay Kikilo under the command of Mayor Gallego, used the automatic weapons to repeatedly ambush the Japanese forces. When the American Armada under General Douglas MacArthur was sighted off Leyte Gulf, the weakened Japanese forces were forced to desert Abuyog, even before the landing of Allied Forces, which included the Filipino troops of the Philippine Commonwealth Army and Philippine Constabulary military units.

After liberation, elementary school education was resumed on December 4, 1944, under the supervision of the Philippine Civil Affairs Unit (PCAU).

In 1946, the new Quirino administration of the opposing political party appointed a liberal mayor (Catalino Landia, the guerilla Captain who rescued Colonel Kangleon after he was captured by the Japanese).

Daughter towns
Javier used to be Barangay Bugho, MacArthur used to be Barangay Taraguna and Mahaplag used to be Barangay Mahaplag.

Tourism

The Church of St. Francis Xavier was first built with nipa, wood and bamboo in 1718 by the Jesuits.  Fr. José Herrera and Cipriano Barbasan restored the church and convent, as well as, the school and Casa Real.  The Augustinians took over the church's supervision in 1768 after it was rebuilt. The church's design was changed in 1781 to conform with the architecture of Roman Renaissance. A more durable church and convent of masonry was later built, with a galvanized iron roof and wooden floor.  In 1965, the church was renovated when an extension was built at the center of the church through the effort of Msgr. Luis D. Caintic who also facilitated in the construction of the new bell tower.
Kuapnit Balinsasayao National Park, along the Mahaplag-Baybay Rd., is a 364-hectare campsite located between Abuyog and Baybay.  It offers a wide panorama of primeval forests, rolling hills with many attractive picnic spots, caves and a view of Mt. Lobi.
The 7-m. high, 10-tiered Malaguicay Falls, in Barangay Malaguicay, has a 3-m. deep pool. From Tab-ok Port, take a 20-min. motorized boat ride to Barangay Malaguicay along the Higasaan River and then a 20-min. hike to the waterfalls.
Caves are found in Brgys. Balocawehay (along the highway) and Nebga (Higasaan).
Tib-o Islet and Undersea Water Cave, in Barangay Tib-o, Abuyog, Leyte, is a unique destination for divers and swimmers to experience and explore the beauty of the cave located within the Leyte Gulf area. Using the islet as a diving board or as a stop-over to view the beauty of Leyte Gulf. There is a coarsely formed rock formation at the side of the cave.
Waterfalls are located in Brgys. Malaguicay, Balinsasayao, Katipunan and Nebga.
The 0.5-hectare Cagbolo Hot Spring (Barangay Cagbolo)
Danghol Hill (Barangay San Isidro)
Layog River (BarangayBalinsasayao) is a stream and the estimated terrain elevation above sea level is 4 meters. There are variant forms of spelling for Layog River or in other languages.
Lake Bito The main source of Leyte Metropolitan Water Service, it covers almost all municipalities in Leyte
Cold Spring (Castanas Spring Resort) along the Maharlika Highway, Barangay Balinsasayao
Abuyog Lighthouse is facing the sea and another attraction in the municipality which serves as a beacon for ships and for the fishermen to prevent them from getting lost at sea during nighttime. Legend says that during the night when a fierce typhoon struck Abuyog, the patron saint St. Francis Xavier was seen here waving his crucifix in order to spare the town from the wrath of the typhoon.

Healthcare

Abuyog District Hospital
Abuyog Rural Health Unit
Balocawehay Rural Health Unit

Education

Abuyog Community College
Secondary

Abuyog Academy
Abuyog National High School
Balocawehay National High School
Kikilo National High School
Hampipila National High School
Libertad National High School
Notre Dame of Abuyog

Primary

Abuyog South Central School
B.V. Closa Central School
Bahay Primary School
Balinsasayao Elementary School
Balocawe Elementary School
Balocawehay Elementary School
Barayong Elementary School
Bayabas Elementary School
Buenavista Elementary School
Bunga Elementary School
Canmarating Elementary School
Gabaldon Central School
Hampipila Elementary School
Picas Primary School
Salvacion Elementary School
San Isidro Elementary School
Santa Fe - Santo Nino Elementary School
Tadoc Primary School
Tabigue Elementary School
Maitum Elementary School
Capili an Elementary School
Odiongan Elementary School
Katipunan Elementary School

References

External links

 [ Philippine Standard Geographic Code]
Local Governance Performance Management System

 
Municipalities of Leyte (province)